The Plumb House is a historic U.S home originally located on the northwest corner of Lakeview and South Fort Harrison Avenues in Clearwater, Florida.  The house was built in about 1896 and used as a paint store on the ground level and apartments on the second floor.  In December 1983, the house was moved to its current location at 1380 South Martin Luther King Jr. Avenue in Clearwater, and serves as the home for the Clearwater Historical Society and the Plumb House Museum.

Plumb House Museum
The Plumb House Museum houses vintage furnishings, historic artifacts and photographs.

See also
Clearwater Historical Society

References

External links

Plumb House Museum - Clearwater Historical Society - official site
"What is the History of the Plumb House" from Clearwater Historical Society website

Buildings and structures in Clearwater, Florida
Florida cracker culture
Historic house museums in Florida
Historical society museums in Florida
Museums in Pinellas County, Florida
Houses in Pinellas County, Florida